Bator is a village in Kharian Tehsil, Gujrat District in the Punjab province of Pakistan. It is located 29 kilometers in the North of Gujrat city. Bator is part of Union Council Bhaddar which is an administrative subdivision of the Tehsil Kharian.

History
Bator is an ancient village. Before the independence of Pakistan, Hindu and Sikh used to live there.

Economy
Economy of Bator is good, approximately 30 percent of its people work overseas. Other people are former, some are Government employers like school teachers army soldiers and a few work in Karachi.

Populated places in Gujrat District